Sigerist is a surname. Notable people with the surname include: 

Henry E. Sigerist (1891–1957), Swiss medical historian
Sigerist Society, British Marxist organisation named in honour of Henry

See also
Siegrist
Sigrist